Faenza (or) is an Italian city and comune of 59,063 inhabitants in the province of Ravenna, Emilia-Romagna, situated  southeast of Bologna.

Faenza is home to a historical manufacture of majolica-ware glazed earthenware pottery, known from the French name of the town as faience.

Geography
Faenza, at the foot of the first sub-apennine hills, is surrounded by an agricultural region including vineyards in the hills, and cultivated land with traces of the ancient Roman land-division system, and fertile market gardens in the plains. In the nearby green valleys of the rivers Samoggia and Lamone there are great number of 18th and 19th century stately homes, set in extensive grounds or preceded by long cypress-lined driveways.

History
According to mythology, the name of the first settlement, Faoentia, had Etruscan and Celtic roots, meaning in Latin "Splendeo inter deos" or "I shine among the gods," in modern English.
The very name, coming from the Romans who developed this center under the name of Faventia, has become synonymous with ceramics (majolica) in various languages, including French (faïence) and English (faience).

Here Quintus Caecilius Metellus Pius defeated the populares army of Gnaeus Papirius Carbo in 82 BC.

From the second half of the 1st century AD the city flourished considerably as a result of its agricultural propensities and the development of industrial activities such as the production of everyday pottery and brickwork objects and linen textiles.

Here Totila and an Ostrogothic army defeated the Byzantine army in Italy in the Battle of Faventia in 542 CE.

After a period of decadence from the 2nd century to the early Middle Ages it regained prosperity from the 8th century on. Around the year 1000 with the government of the Bishops and subsequently in the age of the Comune the city began a long period of richness and building expansion which reached its peak with the rule of the Manfredi family. The first consuls were elected in 1141 and in 1155 a podestà was in charge of government of the city. In the wars between Guelphs and Ghibellines that began in the following years Faenza was at first loyal to the emperor of the Holy Roman Empire. In 1178, however, it changed side and entered the Lombard League. The inner disputes anyway favoured acquisition of power by Maghinardo Pagano, who remained podestà and capitano del popolo for several years.

The Chronicle of Faenza, completed in 1236, is a history of the city from its founding. It shows the city as staunchly Guelph in sympathies. It fought for the pope in the War of the Keys (1229).

At the beginning of the 14th century the Guelph Manfredi began a rule over Faenza that was to last for almost two centuries. The peak of splendour was reached under Carlo II Manfredi, in the second half of the century, when the city centre was renewed. In 1488 Galeotto Manfredi was assassinated by his wife: his son Astorre III succeeded him, but was in turn killed in Rome as a prisoner of Cesare Borgia, who had captured Faenza in 1501.

After a brief period of Venetian domination Faenza became part of the Papal States until 1797.

Faenza lost 1,322 of its citizens during World War II. After months of bombings and a bloody battle was finally liberated by the New Zealand Army (2nd New Zealand Division) on 17 December 1944.

Main sights
Faenza's architectural attractions are concentrated in the two contiguous main squares: Piazza del Popolo, lined by two double order porticoed wings, and Piazza della Libertà.

Religious buildings
 Faenza Cathedral: located along the east side of Piazza della Libertà. Influenced by Tuscan style, it is one of the highest expressions of Renaissance art in Romagna. Built to Giuliano da Maiano's design, it was begun in 1474 and completed in 1511. The marble decoration of the façade remained unfinished. The interior, a nave and two aisles with obvious references to Brunelleschi's San Lorenzo in Florence, houses numerous works of Renaissance art, chiefly sculpture, among which are the tombs of St. Terence and St. Emilian (Tuscan school of the 15th century) and that of St. Savino, perhaps done in Florence by Benedetto da Maiano.
 Sant'Antonio
 San Bartolomeo
 Santa Maria del Carmine
 Church of the Commenda
 Santa Maria ad Nives
 Santa Maria dell’Angelo

Secular buildings
 Palazzo del Podestà and the Town Hall, both of medieval origin, stand in Piazza del Popolo. The former was largely restored in the early 20th century while the latter — radically transformed in the 18th century — was the Palazzo of the Captain of the People and later the residence of the governing Manfredi family.
 Goldsmiths' Portico opposite the Cathedral this open gallery and monumental fountain with bronzes were built in the first decade of the 17th century.
 Clock Tower, in front of the entrance to the Piazza, is a postwar rebuilding of the 17th century tower that stood at the crossroad of the cardo and the decumanus gate of the Roman Faventia.

Among the other monuments of the historic centre are Palazzo Milzetti, the richest and most significant Neoclassical building in the region, and the Teatro Masini (1780–1787). In the nearby, the Villa Case Grandi dei Ferniani has a collection of 18th and 19th century Faenza ceramics.

Natural sites
Grotta Tanaccia Karstic Park and the Carnè Natural Park, a vast green area with a visitor’s centre and refreshments, are also of great interest, characterized by a typical landscape of dolinas, ravines and swallow holes.

Majolica
Faenza is home to the International Museum of Ceramics. The museum houses pieces from all over the world and from every epoch, from classical amphoras to the works of Chagall and Picasso, and there is a rich section dedicated to Faenza pottery in the golden age of the Renaissance. Other interesting art collections are located in the Municipal Art Gallery, the Diocese Museum, the Bendandi Museum and the Manfredi Library. The historic production of Faenza majolica is recognized worldwide as one of the highest moments of artistic creativity expressed through pottery. The tradition was born from a convergence of favourable conditions: a territory rich in clay, a centuries-old history of political and commercial relations with nearby Tuscany (especially with Florence).

As a testament to the popularity of the city's majolica through the ages, on 18 August 2006, Quebec Premier Jean Charest announced that Canadian archaeologists had discovered the precise location of Canada's lost first colony of Charlesbourg-Royal, and that a fragment of a decorative Istoriato plate manufactured in Faenza between 1540 and 1550 was found there that could only have belonged to a member of the French aristocracy in the colony.

Culture 
In September and October international contemporary and classical ceramic art events, such as Argillà Italia and Buongiorno Ceramica, draw majolica amateurs, collectors and artists to Faenza from all over the world. In June the Palio del Niballo, a tournament between five horsemen from the districts of the town, re-evokes the magnificence and struggles of Faenza in the Manfredi epoch.

In the last weekend of September, the MEI - Meeting delle Etichette Indipendenti (Independent Label Meeting) takes place, a musical event in which record companies and musicians who define themselves as independent from the major record companies gather. Musicians of national caliber participate with concerts in the 2/3 evenings of the duration of the event. The event takes place in the historic center.

Typical regional dishes include home-made tagliatelle, cappelletti, lasagna and strozzapreti with the Romagna meat sauce. Some of the typical restaurants in Faenza are La Baita, Marianaza, Trattoria da Manueli where you can find traditional local dishes.

The Botanical Gardens, next to the Civic Natural Science Museum with its collections, houses more than 170 species of plants indigenous to   Romagna.

Sport
The Florence–Faenza  marathon, a demanding long-distance race held during the last weekend in May, attracts athletes of all nationalities.

Faenza is home to the Formula One racing team Scuderia AlphaTauri, formerly Scuderia Toro Rosso, formerly Minardi. Minardi was one of the last small, independent constructors in Formula One, and was bought by Red Bull in 2005, continuing to be based in Faenza.

Also headquartered in Faenza is Gresini Racing, started in 1997 by Fausto Gresini, former 125cc world champion. The team has won 4 motorcycle world championships: one in 250cc with Daijiro Kato, one in Moto 2 with Toni Elías, one in Moto 3 with Jorge Martín and the last one with Matteo Ferrari in MotoE.

Faenza has been host to Motocross World Championship Grand Prix numerous times, the last one in 2020.
The track used is Monte Coralli Circuit, located 8 km from the city center.

Notable people
 

Fabio Babini (born 1969), Italian racing driver
Andrea Bertoni (1454-1483), Servite Order Catholic priest
Samantha Casella (born 1981), Italian director and screenwriter
Matteo Nannini (born 2003), Italian-Argentine racing driver
Laura Pausini (born 1974), Italian singer and composer
Ottaviano da Faenza, 14th century painter
Yuki Tsunoda (born 2000), Formula 1 driver

Transportation
Faenza railway station, at Piazza Cesare Battisti, forms part of the Bologna–Ancona railway.  It is also a terminus of two secondary railways, linking Faenza with Ravenna and Florence, respectively.  Opened in 1893, it replaced an earlier station, which had been opened in 1861 at a location to the east of the present station, near what is now Via Caldesi.

Twin towns — sister cities

Faenza is twinned with:

 Bergerac, France
 Gmunden, Austria
 Jingdezhen, China
 Marousi, Greece
 Rijeka, Croatia
 Schwäbisch Gmünd, Germany
 Talavera de la Reina, Spain
 Timișoara, Romania
 Toki, Japan

See also
Diocese of Faenza-Modigliana

References

External links

Museo Internazionale delle Ceramiche
Museo Internazionale delle Ceramiche Faenza at Google Cultural Institute
Palio del Niballo
Biblioteca Manfrediana
Passatore Race

Faenza
Cities and towns in Emilia-Romagna
Papal States